Jean-Baptiste Marie Antoine de Latil, count then duke of Latil, Peer of France, French ecclesiastic. He is the last to have crowned a King of France in the person of Charles X in 1825.

Biography
Son of Antoine de Latil and Gabrielle Thérèse de Magny, he was born on Île Sainte-Marguerite on March 6, 1761. Ordained a priest in 1784, he was a priest in Saint-Sulpice Parish in Paris. In 1791, he refused to take an oath to the Civil Constitution of the Clergy. Imprisoned, he then went to Düsseldorf and entered the service of Charles Philippe, Count of Artois; he was appointed bishop in partibus Amiclée March 8, 1816 and ordered April 7, 1816, then named bishop of Chartres August 8, 1817. Archbishop of Rheims April 6, 1824; as such, he consecrated Charles X as king on May 29, 1825.

Latil became a Peer of France on October 31, 1822, and was appointed a knight commander of the Holy Spirit on May 12, 1825. He was created cardinal at the Consistory of March 13, 1826, with the title of Cardinal Priest of Saint Sixtus. He followed Charles X in his new exile of 1830.

Latil died in Gémenos (Bouches-du-Rhône) on December 1, 1839. His body is buried in the vault of the archbishops in the cathedral of Reims.

References

1761 births
1839 deaths
Archbishops of Reims
Bishops of Chartres
19th-century French cardinals
Peers of France